Miss Hong Kong 2007 pageant, the 35th Miss Hong Kong pageant was held in the Hong Kong Coliseum on 21 July 2007. Sixteen delegates competed for the title.  Contestant #3: Kayi Cheung was crowned the winner by outgoing titleholder, Aimee Chan.

Results

Placements

Special Awards
Miss Photogenic: #9 Grace Wong 
Miss International Goodwill: #9 Grace Wong 
Miss Tourism Ambassador: #2 Lily Ho
Miss Vivality Ambassador : No. 3 Kayi Cheung 
Most Attractive Legs Award : No. 7 Lorretta Chow

Swimsuit Competition Scores

 Winner
 First Runner-up
 Second Runner-up
 Top 5 Finalist
 Top 8 Semi-finalist
(#) Rank in each round of competition

Delegates
The Miss Hong Kong 2007 delegates were:

Post-Pageant Notes
 Kayi Cheung placed as semi-finalist by awarding Beauty with a Purpose in Miss World 2007 in Sanya, China.
 Kayi Cheung placed 1st runner-up in Miss Chinese International Pageant 2008 in Foshan, China. 
 Grace Wong placed as semi-finalist in Miss International 2007 in Tokyo, Japan. She also awarded Miss Friendship.

International Pageant Success

Miss World: The winner, #3 Kayi Cheung competed in Sanya, China at the Miss World 2007 pageant. For the first time since 1987, Miss Hong Kong made the semi-finals at Miss World. Kayi made the top 16 tying with Miss Ecuador to win the fast track event, Beauty with a Purpose. By winning this award, she automatically made the top 16, becoming only the third Miss Hong Kong to make the semi-finals in 20 years. The last time the nation has made the cut was in 1987 when Miss Hong Kong 1987 Pauline Yeung Bo Ling made the top 12 and won Queen of Asia at Miss World 1987.

Miss International: The first runner up, #9 Grace Wong represented Hong Kong at the Miss International 2007 pageant held in Tokyo, Japan. She made the top 15 at the pageant, being the first Miss Hong Kong (from TVB) to place since 1985, when Ellen Wong (1985's 2nd runner up) made the top 15. She also won the Miss Friendship award, the 4th consecutive Miss Friendship award won since 2004. Her win makes Hong Kong, the nation to win the most Miss Friendship awards at Miss International (6 in total – 1981, 2002, and 2004 to 2007) and the most congenial titles at any international beauty pageant.

Miss Chinese International: The winner, #3 Kayi Cheung represented Hong Kong at Miss Chinese International 2008 where she won 1st runner up title. She is the eighth Miss Hong Kong to take 1st runner up and the first Miss Hong Kong to make the top 3 since Mandy Cho in 2004.

Recruitment

Overseas Recruitment

The Overseas recruitment began on 23 February 2007 and ended on 10 March 2007. Applications were available in New York City, Los Angeles, San Francisco, any TVB rental store in the US, Fairchild TV station, Ontario, Richmond, British Columbia, and any TVB rental store in Canada. Delegates had to send in their applications before 10 March. TVB, organizers of the pageant travel to cities in the US and Canada. They include: Los Angeles, San Francisco, Toronto, and Vancouver. TVB would choose a certain amount of delegates to interview and would call them to interview. Besides personal interviews, delegates had to wear swimsuits chosen by themselves and walk around in it. Four delegates were chosen in total and returned to Hong Kong in late May to compete.

Local Recruitment

The local recruitment was held in Hong Kong. Applications were available in Hong Kong, Australia, New Zealand, Singapore, United Kingdom, and Europe on 11 April 2007. The deadline to send in the applications were 30 April 2007. Weeks later, primary and secondary interviews were conducted. A top 24 was chosen and they recorded a reality TV show (like 2006) to choose the 12 semi-finalists to compete. They joined the four overseas delegates to form the top 16.

Special awards

Sponsor Awards

Perfect Intelligence Star Award 完美智慧之星: No. 11 Kendra Wong 黃頌妍 – Overseas delegate from San Francisco
Image Improvement Star Award 形象躍進之星: No. 15 Joyce Ko Ho Ting 高可庭 – Local Hong Kong delegate
Contestant Most Suited To Wearing Jewelry 最合適佩戴首飾佳麗: No. 12 Nicole Lee 李潔瑩 – Local Hong Kong delegate
Best Perfume Wisdom Award 最具香水智慧獎: No. 6 Anita Wong 王卉霖 – Local Hong Kong delegate

Trivia

This is the second time in the history of the pageant where there is only 16 delegates, eliminating the usually 20 delegates.
This is also the second time where four overseas delegates were chosen. Contestant #3 Kayi Cheung and #8 Janis Leung Wing Sze are from Vancouver. Contestant #11 Kendra Wong Chung Yin is from San Francisco and #16 Jenny Cheng Wai Ching is from Las Vegas. Surprisingly, no delegate from Toronto or Los Angeles made it to Hong Kong (where in recent years, many did).
First overseas delegate from Las Vegas was chosen.
Contestant No. 3 Kayi Cheung participated in the Miss Chinese Vancouver 2005 pageant. She did not make the top 3 but won the Vivacious Beauty Award. No. 7 Lorretta Chow was a guest performer at the pageant, as the NTSA Vancouver winner that year.
Contestant No. 7 Lorretta Chow Mei-Yun is the winner of Fairchild TV's New Talent Singing Awards Vancouver Audition. She represented Vancouver at the New Talent Singing Awards International Finals 2005 in Hong Kong and won the Trendy Image Award. Although she is from Vancouver, she went to Hong Kong to audition and entered the pageant as a local delegate.
Contestant No. 9 Grace Wong Kwan-Hing is from New York. She is a graduate of Bronx High School of Science in 2004, and matriculated at Babson College in Wellesley, MA. Prior to the pageant, she represented New York at the Miss Chinatown USA 2007 pageant. She finished as 1st runner up and was named Miss Chinese Chamber of Commerce. Other beauty queens who won the title were Fala Chen who later represented New York at Miss Chinese International 2005 and finished as 1st runner up. Though Grace is from New York, she went to Hong Kong to compete for the crown and she is considered one of the 12 local Hong Kong delegates instead of the four overseas delegates.
On the television promotion spot, No. 3 Kayi Cheung's Chinese name is incorrectly displayed as 張嘉儀 instead of 張嘉兒.
Out of the 16 contestants, three of them are from University of British Columbia: No. 3 Kayi Cheung, No. 7 Lorretta Chow, and No. 8 Janis Leung. No. 3 and No. 7 went on to win 1st and 3rd respectively. With Kayi's win, UBC has produced 5 Miss Hong Kong winners and in the Miss Chinese International pageant, three winners: Bernice Liu, Linda Chung, and Leanne Li.
The winner, Kayi Cheung is one of the shortest Miss Hong Kongs to date. Standing at 5'4½", she joins Miss Hong Kong 1995 Winnie Young (5'4"), 1997 Virginia Yung (5'4½") and Miss Hong Kong 2001 Shirley Yeung (5'4") as the list of shortest Miss Hong Kongs. However the record goes to Miss Hong Kong 1976, Rowena Lam, at 5'2¾" (Miss Hong Kong 85, Shallin Tse, is 5'3").
Contestant #4 Mandy Wong is a graduate at The Hong Kong Academy For Performing Arts. She is also an actress.

External links
Official Site
Miss HK Beauties

2007 in Hong Kong
Miss Hong Kong Pageants
2007 beauty pageants